PJ Masks is an animated children's television series produced by Entertainment One, Frog Box, and TeamTO. The series is based on the Les Pyjamasques book series by Romuald Racioppo. The series' first season debuted on Disney Junior in the United States on September 18, 2015. The second season premiered on January 15, 2018, the third on April 19, 2019, the fourth on May 15, 2020, and the fifth on August 13, 2021.

Series overview

Episodes

Season 1 (2015–17)

Season 2 (2018–19)

Season 3 (2019–20)

Season 4 (2020–21)

Season 5 (2021–22)

Shorts (2017–20)

References 

 
Lists of French animated television series episodes
Lists of British animated television series episodes